Camp Rucker can refer to:
Fort Rucker, Arizona
Fort Rucker, Alabama